Mark Jones (born 21 April 1970)  is an English former professional darts player.

Career
Jones made his television debut at the 2011 UK Open at the Reebok Stadium in Bolton. He lost out 4–9 Colin Osborne in the last 64 earning himself £1,000 in the process. Jones best result to date was reaching the semi-finals at the 2012 UK Open Qualifier 3 in March, defeating the likes of Vincent van der Voort and Jelle Klaasen before losing 6–4 to Brendan Dolan.

Jones qualified for the 2013 World Championship by finishing 46th on the ProTour Order of Merit, claiming the 15th of 16 places that were awarded to the highest non-qualified players. In his first appearance at the World Championship he lost to Brendan Dolan 3–0 (sets) in the first round, winning just a single leg. Jones failed to qualify for the 2013 UK Open as he finished 142nd on the Order of Merit, outside of the top 96 who claimed their places. He had a disappointing year as he played the full PDC calendar but couldn't advance past the last 32 in any event. Jones began 2014 ranked 65th on the Order of Merit, just outside the top 64 who retained their places for the year ahead and he therefore entered Q School in a bid to regain his tour status. However, he could only win two matches during the four days to only have PDPA Associate Member status for 2014 which gave him entry to UK Open and European Tour qualifiers as well as the Challenge Tour. Jones played all 16 of the Challenge Tour tournaments with his best finishes coming in the last two events when he was a losing quarter-finalist.

A last 32 appearance in the sixth qualifier helped Jones play in the first round of the 2015 UK Open, but he lost 5–3 to Jason Wilson. He has now not played in a PDC event since May 2015.

Outside of darts
Jones is a plasterer by trade.

World Championship results

PDC

2013: First round (lost to Brendan Dolan 0–3) (sets)

References

External links

Living people
English darts players
1970 births
Professional Darts Corporation former tour card holders